Stratton Township is one of fifteen townships in Edgar County, Illinois, USA.  As of the 2010 census, its population was 481 and it contained 230 housing units.  The name of the township was Wayne Township until May 9, 1857.

Geography

Cities, towns, villages
 Vermilion (north three-quarters)

Extinct towns
 Kentucky

Cemeteries
The township contains these three cemeteries: Blackburn, Little Grove and Pryor.
There have been records found for Oak Grove, Whalen, and Wilkins.

Major highways
  US Route 150

Demographics

School districts
 Paris Community Unit School District 4

Political districts
 Illinois' 15th congressional district
 State House District 109
 State Senate District 55

References
 
 United States Census Bureau 2007 TIGER/Line Shapefiles
 United States National Atlas

External links
 City-Data.com
 Illinois State Archives
 Edgar County Official Site

Townships in Edgar County, Illinois
Townships in Illinois